Alison Thorogood (born 30 November 1960) is a British sprint canoer who competed in the early-to-mid-1990s. At the 1992 Summer Olympics in Barcelona, she was eliminated in the semifinals of both the K-1 500 m and the K-4 500 m event. Four years later in Atlanta, Thorogood was eliminated in the semifinals of the K-2 500 m event.

References
Sports-Reference.com profile

1960 births
Canoeists at the 1992 Summer Olympics
Canoeists at the 1996 Summer Olympics
Living people
Olympic canoeists of Great Britain
British female canoeists